Miriam Jiménez Román (June 11, 1951 – August 6, 2020) was a Puerto Rican scholar, activist, and author on Afro-Latino culture, whose work is described as "without a doubt ... [making] an enormous contribution to the theoretical discussion surrounding Latinidad in the United States." Her work on Afro-Latinidad was foundational to the field of cultural studies in that she developed programming, research, and spaces for the various Afro-Latino communities in the United States.

Biography

Jiménez Román was born on June 11, 1951 in Aguadilla, Puerto Rico. Miriam graduated from Manhattan’s High School of Art and Design in 1969, She was a visiting scholar in Africana Studies at New York University. Along with her husband, Juan Flores, she was co-editor of the Afro-Latin@ Studies Reader: History and Culture in the United States, a collection of essays, short stories, poetry, memoirs, interviews and writing on the Afro-Latino experience. The work was described as "a corrective text that helps fill in crucial scholarly gaps" in a field, Afro-Latina/o studies, in which there is very little scholarship. It "makes accessible ... a virtually ignored set of important contributions ... to the study of Afro-Latina/os", and, "makes a critical intervention in scholarship and public discourse about racial identities and the history and culture of U.S. Afro-Latina/o communities." Jiménez Román and Flores received an American Book Award for The Afro-Latin@Reader in 2011.

Her other publications included “Un hombre (negro) del pueblo: José Celso Barbosa and the Puerto Rican Race Towards Whiteness”, "Looking at that Middle Ground: Racial Mixing as Panacea?", and “Triple-Consciousness? Approaches to Afro-Latino Culture in the United States."

She was Executive Director of the Afrolatin@ forum from 2011 to 2020. She was also a member of the Black Latinas Know Collective and a member of the advisory board for the Encyclopedia Africana.

She was profiled on Remezcla as the first of "8 Afro Latinos Who Made Important Contributions to US History", by Mitú as an "Afro-Latino Figure Who Changed The World For The Good", and by Latina as one of "6 Afro-Latinas Who Are Changing the World!".

Miriam Jiménez Román died of cancer at age 69 on August 6, 2020, in Cabo Rojo, Puerto Rico.

References

External links
10 Years After Its Original Release, ‘The Afro-Latin@ Reader’ Still Resonates - review by  Janel Martinez, Remezcla, 2019
Miriam Jiménez Román - A Tribute at Latino Rebels

1951 births
2020 deaths
People from Aguadilla, Puerto Rico
Puerto Rican people of African descent
Puerto Rican academics
Puerto Rican activists
African-American women academics
American women academics
African-American academics
High School of Art and Design alumni
African-American activists
21st-century Puerto Rican women writers
American Book Award winners
21st-century American women
21st-century African-American women
20th-century African-American people
20th-century African-American women
African-American women writers